Christodulus of Jerusalem may refer to:

Christodulus I of Jerusalem, Melkite patriarch from 937 to 951
Christodulus II of Jerusalem, Melkite patriarch from 966 to 969